The Shop-books Evidence Act 1609 (7 Jac 1 c 12) was an Act of the Parliament of England.

The words "This Act to contynue to the end of the first Session of the next Parliament and noe longer" at the end of the Act were repealed by section 1 of, and the Schedule to, the Statute Law Revision Act 1863. The footnote to this repeal says that these words from section 3 in Ruffhead's Edition.

In section 1, the words of commencement, and the words "hereafter to be" wherever occurring, were repealed by section 1 of, and Schedule 1 to, the Statute Law Revision Act 1948.

The whole Act, so far as unrepealed, was repealed by section 1 of, and Part VII of the Schedule to, the Statute Law (Repeals) Act 1969.

References
 Halsbury's Statutes,

Acts of the Parliament of England
1609 in law
1609 in English law